Terence Jonathan "T. J." Parker (born May 16, 1984) is a French-American former professional basketball player and a current professional coach. Currently, he is the head coach of the French basketball team, ASVEL.

Early life
Parker attended Lisle High School, in Lisle, Illinois, where he played both high school basketball and football.

Playing career

College career
Parker played college basketball at Northwestern University, with the Northwestern Wildcats, from 2002 to 2005.

Professional career
In 2005, after playing college basketball at Northwestern University in Illinois, Parker came back to France, and he suited up for the Paris Basket Racing club. On November 19, 2006, he scored a career-high 23 points, on 7-for-11 shooting from 3-point range, in an 83–77 win over Pau-Orthez. In 2007, he joined the French Pro A League club SLUC Nancy.

In 2009, he moved to the French Pro A League club ASVEL. After playing in the French 3rd Division with Orchies, Parker retired from playing pro club basketball in 2010, due to knee issues.

National team career
Parker was a member of the French Under-18 and Under-20 junior national teams. He played with France's Under-18 junior national team at the 2002 FIBA Europe Under-18 Championship. Parker also trained with the senior French national team in 2006.

Coaching career
After his short playing career, Parker decided to become an assistant coach with the French club ASVEL, in 2013. In January 2018, he became the club's interim head coach, after J. D. Jackson was fired from the position. After that, Parker was once again an assistant coach with the club, working under the team's head coach at the time, Zvezdan Mitrović.

On June 17, 2020, Parker was promoted, and he became the team's new head coach.

Personal life
T. J. Parker's father Tony Parker Sr., is a former professional basketball player. His mother, Pamela Firestone, is Dutch. Parker's great-uncle Jan Wienese, is an Olympic gold medalist in rowing. T. J. Parker is the younger brother of Tony Parker, who is the President of the French basketball club ASVEL, and a former basketball player of the NBA clubs the San Antonio Spurs and the Charlotte Hornets. His younger brother Pierre, is a former professional basketball player.

References

External links
T. J. Parker Player Profile @ FIBA.com
T. J. Parker Player Profile @ FIBA Europe.com
T. J. Parker Player Profile @ EuroLeague.net
T. J. Parker Player Profile @ Pro-Ballers.com
T. J. Parker Player Profile @ RealGM.com
T. J. Parker Player Profile @ Basketball-Reference.com
T. J. Parker Player Profile @ Draft-Express.com
T. J. Parker Player Profile @ LNB.fr 
T. J. Parker Coach Profile @ Eurobasket.com

1984 births
Living people
American men's basketball coaches
American men's basketball players
ASVEL Basket coaches
ASVEL Basket players
BC Orchies players
Black French sportspeople
French basketball coaches
French emigrants to the United States
French expatriate basketball people in the United States
French men's basketball players
French people of African-American descent
French people of Dutch descent
French Roman Catholics
Northwestern Wildcats men's basketball players
Paris Racing Basket players
Sportspeople from Valenciennes
Point guards
Shooting guards
SLUC Nancy Basket players
Sportspeople from Bruges